Wolfgang Pass is a high mountain pass in the eastern Swiss Alps in the canton of Grisons in Switzerland.

It connects Klosters and Davos with Davos being almost level with the pass. The pass road has a maximum grade of 10 percent and is kept open year-round.

A line of the Rhaetian Railway also crosses the pass since 1890.

The pass is comparatively low as a mountain pass and was historically used also for international trade via the southern adjacent Scaletta Pass and later via the newly built road across Flüela Pass from 1868. This road is still closed nowadays in winter and motorists are forced to use the Car shuttle train through the Vereina Tunnel (or drive a long detour via Julier pass).

See also
 List of highest paved roads in Europe
 List of mountain passes
 List of the highest Swiss passes

References

External links

 international hike on historic route Hiking Switzerland passes in Graubünden on old trading route.

Mountain passes of Switzerland
Mountain passes of the Alps
Mountain passes of Graubünden
Rail mountain passes of Switzerland
Klosters-Serneus
Davos